Candelaria, officially the Municipality of Candelaria,  is a 1st class municipality in the province of Quezon, Philippines. According to the 2020 census, it has a population of 137,881 people.

It is the third most populous settlement of Quezon after Lucena City and Sariaya. Among the municipalities in Quezon Province, Candelaria has the most desiccated coconut factories and oil refineries, such as Peter Paul Philippine Corporation, Primex Coco Products Inc., Pacific Royal Basic Foods, SuperStar Corporation, Tongsan Industrial Development Corporation, and others, which employ thousands of people.

History

Foundation
Prior to 1885, the pioneering barangays of Candelaria in its western part, Taguan (Bukal), Kinatihan and Masin were parts of the Municipality of Tiaong, while Malabanban, Mangilag and Santa Catalina in the east, were under the jurisdiction of the town of Sariaya.
Sr. Don Ciriaco Nadres, a local leader of Barangay Masinand his wife Sra. Doña Baltazara Bustamante, with the support of Don Simeon Nadres and wife Doña Everista Ona, Don Justo Argao, Don Elino de Gala, Don Apolinario Gonzales, Don Tomas Cabuñag, Don Ignacio de Ramos, Don Domingo de Alday, Don Tomas Regidor, Don Juan del Valle, Don Ambrocio Salazar, Don Buenaventura Cedeño and Don Hipolito Martinez, proposed the establishment of an independent government over these barangays. They became known as the founding families of the town.
It was on December 26, 1878, that a permit was granted by the Governor-General of the Philippine Islands, Domingo Moriones y Murillo for the establishment of an independent government over these barangays. Its boundaries were fixed by means of a treaty signed by the notable leaders of Tiaong, Sariaya and the founding families of Candelaria.

King Alfonso XII of Spain finally approved the establishment of Candelaria as an independent town on August 5, 1879.

American Era and Japanese Occupation
In 1902, after the cessation of the general hostilities against the Americans, administration of Candelaria was merged with the neighboring town of Sariaya. In 1907, Candelaria was again managed independently, as a fourth-class municipality. During the American regime, the town progressed by leaps and bounds. Many houses and public edifices were constructed, and commerce and industries grew, until the Japanese invasion brought a further wave of destruction.

Geography
To its northern part lies the famous Mount Banahaw, to the east is the town of Sariaya, to the south is San Juan, Batangas, and to the west are the towns of Dolores and Tiaong. The neighboring cities are Lucena, Tayabas, San Pablo and Lipa City. It is traversed by the Pan Philippine Highway and the Philippine National Railways.

Candelaria has an area of about 12,910 hectares and is an agricultural municipality, situated in the southern part of Mount Banahaw. The town proper is wedged by two rivers, namely, Masin and Quiapo rivers.

Barangays

Candelaria is politically subdivided into 25 barangays, listed here with their respective Barangay Captains as of 2015 and population as of 2020:

Climate

There are two pronounced seasons in Candelaria: Dry and hot season from March to May, Wet season from June to December. Typhoons struck the municipality every three to five years. The most remarkable are Supertyphoon Angela (Rosing) in 1995, Typhoon Xangsane (Milenyo) in 2006, and Typhoon Rammasun (Glenda) in 2014.

Topography
Candelaria is more elevated in the northern part since it lies at the southern slope of Banahaw and is predominantly agricultural. There are plantations of coconut and vegetables in its remote barangays. Most of the inhabitants are having poultry and livestock business and in the remaining part of the municipality are farmlands mostly of rice, corn, and other root crops.

Demographics

Candelaria has a population of 117,434 as of the 2015 census. The increase in population became rapid in the 1990s, in 1995, it has a population of 80,733 inhabitants, while in 2000, the population grew to 92,429, with an increase of about 15 percent.

In 2007, the official number of inhabitants in the municipality based on 2007 census is 105,997, or about 4,240 families or 21,243 households. Most Candelarians reside in Pahinga Norte and Malabanban Norte, the adjacent barangays of the town proper.

As of 2007, almost 93 percent of the population are Roman Catholics, 3.5 percent are Protestants, about 3 percent are members of Iglesia ni Cristo, 0.05 percent are of Islam, 0.97 percent are of other denominations such as Church of Christ / Christian Churches (Iglesia ni Kristo-INK), Pentecostalists, Fundamental Baptist, Bible Baptist, Conservative Baptist, Latter Day Saints, Seventh Day Adventist, Jehovah's Witnesses and others.

Language

Tagalog is widely spoken by the populace. However, their accent resembles the Tagalog dialect spoken in Batangas owing to its location, and history. Most of Candelarians came from the neighboring province of Batangas.

Economy 

Candelaria is one of the most progressive municipalities in Quezon Province. Rapid progress have been felt since the 1990s where most of the commercial establishments have been built such as retail merchandising, supermarkets (Puregold, South Emerald, and others), hardware, fastfood outlets or restaurants (including AMC Robledo's Garden and Catering, Jollibee, McDonald's, Greenwich, Chowking, Mang Inasal, Buddy's Restaurant, Tea Soi, and others), shopping mall (Waltermart), and others. The Candelaria Public Market, though it is adjacent to Barangay Poblacion, is located on Barangay Pahinga Norte.

Tourism

 Bread Country Pasalubong
 n2o Food Garage
 Kandelarya the Farm Kitchen
 Gracia's Premium Native Deli
 FOG Business Center
 Adriana Bed and Breakfast
 Club Candelaria Events Place
 Our Mother of Perpetual Help Parish Church of Taguan
 San Pedro Bautista Parish Church of Candelaria
 Quezon Premier Hotel and Resort
 Casa Patricia Hotel and Resort
 Birhen Bato [Masalukot 4]
 Mount Mayabobo in Barangay Mayabobo
 Mount Malasina in Barangay Masin Norte
 Tower Resort
 Pol Step (Dapian) Resort in Barangay Malabanban Sur
 Bukal Resort in Barangay Masalukot I
 Le Donna Café
 Ongville Hotel and Event Hall
 Grand Central Hotel
 Tilarog Resort in Barangay Masalukot II
 Uma Verde Econature Farm
 Waltermart
 Silong Resort in Bukal Sur

Culture

Candle Festival
The town fiesta is celebrated on February 5 to honor the patron saint San Pedro Bautista. Since 2017, Rev. Msgr. Melecio Verastigue, started a dance to honor San Pedro Bautista. It is called INDAK PUGAY. A dance to honor the martyrdom of the patron saint, San Pedro Bautista.

Since 2005, Monsignor Carlos (Charles) Pedro A. Herrera, the parish priest, started his devotion to Nuestra Senora de Candelaria and honored her with a Candle Festival every February 2. The celebration was concluded with a procession through the streets of the town featuring the street dancing by the youth of the community in honor of the Blessed Virgin.  A parade of floats representing each of the 25 barangays was, also, featured during the festivities.

A project in honor of the Blessed Mother Mary that will renovate the patio of the San Pedro Bautista Parish Church had been developed on April 22, 2012.  The renovated patio will convert the current parking lot into a multi-purpose open amphitheater for use of the people of Candelaria.  It will provide a venue for children and toddlers playground, jogging/walking path, a rosary garden, a via Dolorosa, and a stage for performances complete with controlled theater lighting.  The playground will be lit with lighting standards.  The fundraising for the project will be accomplished through a 1000 Points of Light campaign where each point of light will be represented by a Candelarian or friends of Candelaria contributing Php5000 or more.  Inauguration is scheduled for February 2, 2013, CANDLE FESTIVAL celebration.  Ground breaking is targeted for August 4, 2012, ARAW NG CANDELARIA.  The community project is expecting every Candelarians around the world to step up and bring their "POINT OF LIGHT".  The SPBPC parish council for economic affairs is taking the lead with Dr. Al Cornejo at the helm.

Government

Elected officials
Municipal council (2022-2025):
 Mayor: George D. Suayan (NPC)
 Vice Mayor: Macario D. Boongaling (NPC)
 Councilors:
 Aileen M. Dellosa (NPC)
 Julius D. Maniebo (NPC)
 Lydelle M. Dizon (Aksyon Demokratiko)
 Rodante A. Padillo (NPC)
 Darren P. de Gala (NPC)
 Anatalia R. Atienza (Aksyon Demokratiko)
 Ma. Lourdes Bernadette G. Liwanag (NPC)
 Numeriano S. Briones (NPC)
 ABC President: Reverend H. Manalo
 SK Federation President: Daveilyn S. Arienda

Former heads and mayors (1879–2022)

 Don Simeon Nadres, 1879–1883
 Don Clemente Nadres, 1883–1887
 Don Tomas Cabunag, 1887–1891
 Don Apolinario Gonzales, 1891–1895
 Don Pedro de Gala, 1895–1898
 Don Benigno Nadres, 1898–1900
 Don Elino de Gala, 1900–1902
 Don Herminigildo Nadres, 1908–1912, 1919–1921
 Don Juan Javier, 1912–1916
 Don Generoso de Gala, 1916–1918
 Don Gregorio Remata, 1918–1919
 Don Francisco Fernandez, 1921–1922
 Don Mansueto Javier, 1922–1925
 Don David Reyroso, 1925–1928
 Don Emilio de Gala, 1928–1931
 Dr. Generoso Nadres Sr., 1931–1934
 Dr. Vicente Macasaet, 1934–1937
 Pastor Javier, 1937–1941, 1943–1944, 1945–1946
 Juan Ramos, 1941
 Francisco Malabanan, 1941–1943
 Cresenciano de Gala, 1944–1945
 Felix Ona, 1946–1947, 1955–1959
 Eligio Manalo, 1947–1955
 Venancio Dia, 1959–1967
 Cipriano Maliwanag, 1967–1978
 Pedro Cedeno, 1978–1986
 David Emralino, 1986–1998, 2001–2007
 Isidro de Gala, 1998–2001
 Ferdinand Maliwanag, 1998, 2007-2016
 Macario Boongaling, 2016-2022
 George Suayan, 2022–present

Infrastructure

Transportation

Road network
There are three major highways that pass throughout the municipality and the town proper. The South Luzon Expressway Toll Road 4 (TR4) stretching from Santo Tomas, Batangas to Lucena City will pass in the northern part of the municipality, planned to be finished in 2021. The new expressway will occupy portions of Barangays Bukal Norte, Masalukot II, Masalukot I, Mayabobo, and Mangilag Norte.

The Pan Philippine Highway (also known as Maharlika Highway or National Highway), passes through the municipality west–east from Barangay Bukal Sur to Barangay Mangilag Sur. It connects the municipality to its neighboring towns of Tiaong and Sariaya, and cities like San Pablo City in Laguna and Lucena City, the provincial capital.
The Candelaria-Bolboc Road (also known as Candelaria-San Juan Road) is a  two-lane highway that starts at the Pan Philippine Highway junction in Barangay Malabanban Norte going straight south to the municipality of San Juan, Batangas. This is an alternative road for commuters from Metro Manila via Batangas.
The Candelaria Bypass Road (also known as Candelaria Diversion Road) is a two-lane bypass road that serves as an alternative road for commuters from Metro Manila to Batangas and Bicol Region. Opened in 2012, this  road starts at Barangay Bukal Sur turning south to Barangays Masin Sur, Pahinga Norte, Malabanban Sur and Mangilag Sur. It intersects the Candelaria-Bolboc Road at Barangay Malabanban Sur and crosses the Philippine National Railway in Mangilag Sur. It ends at the eastern portion of Maharlika Highway right after United Candelaria Doctors Hospital.

There are also major roads within the municipality.

Rizal Avenue is the two-lane main road located in Barangay Poblacion. It connects Barangay Masin Norte and Sur in the west and Malabanban Norte in the east. Some landmarks located here are the Municipal Hall, Catholic Church, and Plaza Narra.
Cabunag Street also in Barangay Poblacion is the municipality's main business district. Most of business establishments such as hardware stores like Licup Builders the oldest hardware store in town, RTWs, pharmacies, footwear, general merchandise, and restaurants are located here. It also serves as a thoroughfare for local commuters going to nearby barangays such as Pahinga Norte and Masalukot I.
Ramos Street-Masalukot Barangay Road is a road that starts at Maharlika Highway in Barangay Poblacion and ends at Barangay Masalukot III. This is also an access road to most of subdivisions located in Barangay Masalukot I such as School View Park Subdivision, Village of St. Jude (VSJ), Maria Cristina Village, St. Anthony Subdivision, Villa Macaria Country Homes, Clarisse Subdivision, Faustin Floraville, and others. There are also schools located along the road, such as Grabsum School Inc. and Dr. Panfilo Castro National High School Annex.
Tibanglan Road is a dirt road that serves as a main access to Barangay Mayabobo from Maharlika Highway in Barangay Malabanban Norte, in front of Iglesia ni Cristo Church.
Pahinga-Kinatihan Road is a barangay road that starts at Cabunag Street down south to Barangay Kinatihan II. It serves as an access road to Candelaria Bypass Road from the town proper. Some landmarks located along the road are Peter Paul Philippine Corporation, Pahinga Norte Elementary School, Cocoma, and Villa Katrina Subdivision. A junction located in Barangay Pahinga Norte right after the spillway across Quiapo River connects it towards Barangay Santa Catalina Norte.
Mangilag-Concepcion Road is a barangay road that starts at Maharlika Highway in Mangilag Sur and an access road to Barangays Mayabobo and Concepcion Banahaw in Sariaya, Quezon. Some landmarks found here are Dr. Panfilo Castro National High School, Mangilag Norte Elementary School, and Mount Mayabobo.

Public transport

Provincial Buses to and from Metro Manila and Lucena City such as JAC Liner Inc., DLTBCO, JAM Liner, Dela Rosa Liner and Lucena Lines stops at the municipality's designated bus stop located in Poblacion for passengers.

SUPREME, a bus plying Batangas City - Lucena City route and vice versa also passes through Candelaria (Sambat).

There are also jeepney terminals located in the town proper. For passengers going to Lucena City, the terminal is located in Rizal Avenue corner Gonzales Street in front of Bank of the Philippine Islands branch. For passengers going to San Pablo City, the terminal is located beside Metrobank in Rizal Avenue corner Del Valle Street. For passengers going to San Juan, Batangas the terminal is located in Gonzales Street.

Tricycles are the most common mode of transportation in the municipality. There are many tricycle terminals in Barangay Poblacion, serving local commuters to the nearby barangays.

Water transport

Candelaria has no coastline and is one of the inland municipalities of Quezon Province, together with Dolores, Lucban, Sampaloc, San Antonio, Tayabas, and Tiaong. The seaport nearest to the municipality is Dalahican Port in Lucena City for passengers going to Marinduque, Masbate, and other island provinces. Dalahican Port is about 30 kilometers from Candelaria. Among the international seaports in Luzon, Batangas Port in Batangas City is the nearest. It would take approximately two hours in a private vehicle to reach from Candelaria, passing through the municipalities of San Juan, Rosario, and Ibaan, Batangas.

Air transport

Candelaria has no airport, runway or any facility to accommodate air operations. The nearest airbase in the municipality is the San Fernando Airbase in Lipa City with a distance of about 32 kilometers west of the municipality, while the nearest international airport is Ninoy Aquino International Airport in Pasay. For air travelers, you have to travel for more or less two hours to reach Metro Manila and a couple of minutes more for Ninoy Aquino International Airport in case of traffic obstructions.

Communications

Candelaria is served by General Telephone System, Inc. (GTSi) and Digitel Telecommunications  (PLDT-Digitel) as the main telecommunication services providers. GTSi has started its operations in the municipality in 1981, making it the third municipality where it started its operation, the first two are Gumaca in 1977 and Atimonan in 1979.

Internet shops are commonly found in the town proper.

Healthcare

Candelaria has three hospitals: one public and two private.
 Candelaria Municipal Hospital (known as Nursery, built in 1984) - located in Barangay Masin Norte.
 Peter Paul Medical Center (formerly Peter Paul Hospital, built in 1948) - located in Regidor St., Barangay Poblacion.
 United Candelaria Doctors Hospital (built in 2009) - located in Maharlika Highway near Candelaria Bypass Road, Barangay Mangilag Sur.

The Candelaria Municipal Hospital is built during the administration of then Mayor Pedro Cedeno in 1984. Peter Paul Medical Center is one of the pioneering hospitals of the municipality, established in 1948. United Candelaria Doctors Hospital is the newly built medical facility of Candelaria, opened in February 2009.

Each barangay has its own health center for free health services. More lying-in clinics are located throughout the municipality.

Education

Pre-school

 Brentley Montessori School
 Brisbane Integrated School

Primary

 Candelaria Elementary School Main
 Candelaria Elementary School Annexes 1 and 2
 Manuel Luis Quezon Elementary School (Cheng Hua Chinese School)
 GRABSUM School, Inc. (School View)
 Manuel S. Enverga University Foundation Candelaria, Inc.
 Headstart Christian Learning Institute
 Trinity Christian Academy
 Buenavista East Elementary School
 Buenavista West Elementary School
 Bukal Norte Elementary School (Mayapyap Annex)
 Bukal Norte Elementary School
 Bukal Sur Elementary School
 Kinatihan I Elementary School
 Kinatihan II Elementary School
 The Lady Mediatrix Institute Inc.
 Malabanban Norte Elementary School
 Malabanban Sur Elementary School
 Mangilag Norte Elementary School
 Mangilag Sur Elementary School
 Masalukot I Elementary School
 Masalukot II Elementary School
 Masalukot III Elementary School
 Masalukot IV Elementary School
 Masalukot V Elementary School
 Masin Elementary School
 Mayabobo Elementary School
 Newton Science School Inc.
 Pahinga Norte Elementary School
 Pahinga Sur Elementary School
 San Andres Elementary School
 San Isidro Elementary School
 Santa Catalina Norte Elementary School
 Santa Catalina Central School
 SEACOMS (Village of St. Jude Subdivision)
 Tayabas Western Academy
 United Evangelical School of Candelaria, Quezon - (Formerly UCCP Pre-School)

Secondary
 Manuel S. Enverga University Foundation Candelaria, Inc.
 Newton Science School Inc.
 GRABSUM School, Inc.
 The Lady Mediatrix Institute, Inc.
 Tayabas Western Academy
 Santa Catalina National High School
 Bukal Sur National High School
 Dolores Macasaet National High School
 Dr. Panfilo Castro National High School
 Dr. Panfilo Castro National High School (Masalukot I Annex)

Tertiary
 Manuel S. Enverga University Foundation (Candelaria Campus)
 Tayabas Western Academy
 Compskill Learning Academy
 Chrisville Institute of Technology
 GRABSUM School, Inc.

Notable personalities

 Raimund Marasigan, rock musician of the band Eraserheads, Pedicab, Sandwich, Cambio, Project 1, Squid 9, and Gaijin
 Ahtisa Manalo, Binibining Pilipinas International 2018 and Miss International 2018 1st Runner-Up
 Cesar Bolaños, former Governor of Quezon and Member of Batasang Pambansa, 1984-1987
 Edelissa Ramos, National Gawad Saka Awardee and Quezon Medalya ng Karangalan awardee
 Rio Locsin, actress

References

External links

 Candelaria Profile at PhilAtlas.com
 [ Philippine Standard Geographic Code]
 Philippine Census Information
 Local Governance Performance Management System
 Quezon Province Business Directory and Travel Guide
 Quezon Province Web Portal
 Lucena City Community Website

Municipalities of Quezon